Petek may refer to:

 Petek (surname)
 Petek, Kayapınar, a village in Diyarbakır Province, Turkey
 Petek, Murgul, a village in Artvin Province, Turkey
 Petek, the Hungarian name of Petecu village, Ulieș Commune, Harghita County, Romania

See also
 
 Patek (disambiguation)